The Ministry of Finance (in French: Ministère des Finances) is a department in the government of Quebec. Its official purpose is to "foster economic development and advise the government on financial matters," and the department's responsibilities include providing advice in budgetary, fiscal, economic, financial and accounting matters.

The department is overseen by the Quebec finance minister. As of November 2018, this office is held by Éric Girard.

The Ministry of Finance administers Quebec's Balanced Budget Act, which prohibits a budget deficit, other than in special circumstances.

References

Quebec government departments and agencies

Quebec